Hannah Margaret Mary Closs (1905-1953) was an art critic and novelist. She wrote three novels and a book on aesthetics.

Biography
Hannah Margaret Mary Closs (née Priebsch) was born in Hampstead, London, the daughter of German scholar Robert Priebsch (1866–1935). She wrote a book on aesthetics, Her Art and Life (1936), and a re-working of the Tristan story (1940). Her three novels, republished as the Tarn Trilogy, treat Catharism.

She married August Closs, an Austrian-born professor of German Studies, in 1931. They had one daughter, Elizabeth Closs Traugott, who was a professor of linguistics and English at Stanford University, from 1970 to 2003. She fell ill with toxaemia and died in Bristol General Hospital.

Bibliography

Novels
High are the Mountains (1945)
And Sombre are the Valleys (1949, republished as Deep are the Valleys, 1960)
The Silent Tarn (1955)

References

1905 births
1953 deaths
English art critics
Writers from London
20th-century English novelists